Youthful Daze is a web series originally released on Vimeo. The series stars Bryan James, Jen Lilley, and Chrishell Stause.

Premise
The series follows character Drew Castle, who has a split personality persona Joshua, in Calabasas, California.

Production
The series was created by Bryan James and based on Beverly Hills 90210, his favorite childhood show. Season five premiered in February 2016.

Reality television star Scott Disick appeared on two episodes of the series.

Awards and nominations

In 2016, Rick Hearst earned the show's first Daytime Emmy nomination.

References

External links
 

2012 web series debuts
American drama web series
2010s American drama television series
Internet soap operas
English-language television shows